CIRS was a Canadian radio station, broadcasting at 530 AM in Sault Ste. Marie, Ontario. Owned and operated by Rogers Sports & Media, the station broadcast a tourist information format for travellers crossing the Sault Ste. Marie International Bridge. The station is listed as silent in the CRTC databases and has been off the air since 2010.

The station was licensed by the CRTC in 1986.

References

External links

IRS
IRS
IRS
Radio stations established in 1986
1986 establishments in Ontario
2010 disestablishments in Ontario
Radio stations disestablished in 2010
IRS (AM)